The Philippine Sea Frontier (PHILSEAFRON) was a United States Navy Sea Frontier active in 1941, and reformed in 1944.

On 8 December 1941 it was part of the 16th Naval District, a component of the United States Asiatic Fleet. 

(Naval Coastal Frontier until 6 February 1942)
Inactive from 6 May 1942 to 13 November 1944)
Rear Admiral Francis W. Rockwell:   7 December 1941--18 March 1942
Captain Kenneth M. Hoeffel:   18 March 1942--6 May 1942

The Philippine Sea Frontier (Rear Admiral James L. Kauffman, Commander) was reestablished as a separate command under Commander Seventh Fleet (Southwest Pacific Area) on 13 November 1944. Rear Admiral J. L. Kauffman embarked in the amphibious force command ship  to establish his temporary headquarters aboard while the ship was berthed at San Pedro Bay, Leyte as Commander, Philippine Sea Frontier, from 29 November to 2 December 1944. Kauffman was later promoted to vice admiral. He was charged with the mission of safeguarding and protecting shipping in the area under his cognizance. 

He maintained an Operations Board at his headquarters at Tolosa, Leyte, on which was kept a running record of the scheduled and actual arrival and departure of vessels of all categories in the area under his cognizance. His Headquarters was given intelligence of all submarine activity in the Philippine Sea.

During the period of the loss of the cruiser , Commander, Philippine Sea Frontier, Vice Admiral Kauffman was absent from his command since 1 July 1945, on temporary duty status in the United States; Commodore N. C. Gillette was in temporary command; and the Operations Officer of the Headquarters Staff, Captain A. M. Granum, was intensively occupied in diversion of shipping in typhoon areas and operations.

Vice Admiral Kauffman handed over command on 2 September 1945. 

 served as a unit of Submarines, Philippine Sea Frontier, from September 1945 to April 1946.

References

 Samuel Eliot Morison. History of United States Naval Operations in World War II... Victory in the Pacific 1945. .

External links
 Glossary of U.S. Naval Abbreviations (OPNAV 29-P1000)
 Admiral Richard Bates Papers
 reported to General Douglas McArthur as Commander Philippine Sea Frontier. In May 1946, Vice Admiral Kauffman...

Philippine Sea Frontier